Vozneseni is a commune in Leova District, Moldova. It is composed of three villages: Troian, Troița and Vozneseni.

References

Communes of Leova District
Bulgarian communities in Moldova